The ninth series of British reality television series The Apprentice (UK) was broadcast in the UK on BBC One, from 7 May to 17 July 2013. This series saw the task format return to its original arrangement prior to the seventh series. The decision to return to this original format layout meant that Alan Sugar could now get more in-depth knowledge of the finalists' business plans, unlike in the past two series, through arranging the final task towards them promoting their idea to both himself and a large selection of industry experts. Alongside the standard twelve episodes, with the first two aired within a day of each other, two specials were aired alongside this series – "The Final Five" on 8 July, and "Why I Fired Them" on 11 July.

Sixteen candidates took part in the ninth series, with Leah Totton becoming the overall winner. Excluding specials, the series averaged around 7.34 million viewers during its broadcast.

Series overview 
Applications for the ninth series began in Spring 2012, with the selection process of auditions, assessments and interviews held within mid-Summer of that year. After the sixteen candidates for the final line-up were selected, filming began in October 2012. Following the past two series, production staff and Sugar returned the format of the episode schedule back to the original layout, prior to the seventh series. This decision was aimed at making the final task focused on assigning the finalists of the series with creating a brand for their plan, and pitching their ideas to a large group of experts, regarding their plan's intentions, cost and pricing details, how it would expand, and other notable business details, thus providing more in-depth information for Sugar to have available than provided by just the Interviews stage. In addition, Sugar brought back the use of exotic filming locations, with the global economic recession coming to an end, by arranging for one of his tasks of this series to be held within Dubai. Alongside these changes, Matthew Riley left the programme after two series, leading to Sugar replacing him with Claudine Collins for the Interviews stage.

In the first task, the woman named their team as Evolve, while the men named their team Endeavour. Of those who took part, Leah Totton would become the eventual winner, and go on to use her investment towards opening up a chain of cosmetic skin clinics, with her first being opened on 22 January 2014. One notable matter that arose during film, was the discovery that Jordan Poulton had violated one of the rules regarding his application to the show, which prompted production staff and researchers to improve their thorough checks on applicants in future series to avoid further issues.

Candidates

Performance chart 

Key:
 The candidate won this series of The Apprentice.
 The candidate was the runner-up.
 The candidate won as project manager on his/her team, for this task.
 The candidate lost as project manager on his/her team, for this task.
 The candidate was on the winning team for this task / they passed the Interviews stage.
 The candidate was on the losing team for this task.
 The candidate was brought to the final boardroom for this task.
 The candidate was fired in this task.
 The candidate lost as project manager for this task and was fired.

Episodes

Controversy 
Jordan Poulton's application

As part of the format's rules since the seventh series for applications to The Apprentice, the producers make clear that any participants who enter the contest must not include any company(s) to their business plan if they do not have either ownership or co-ownership. When Jordan Poulton applied for the programme, production staff hadn't properly checked his application, which showed that he had named a company in his business plan that was not his, a fact that was not noticed until the interviews stage of the contest, when Claude Littner discovered the staff's oversight. Although Poulton's involvement in the programme was broadcast, despite this oversight, he later admitted on Twitter, while thanking his supporters, that he had been "naive" and apologised for "wasting everyone's time".

Ratings 
Official episode viewing figures are from BARB.

Note: During the 2-hour final, the show was shared with The Apprentice: You're Hired, and as a result the figures are lower than usual. The first hour was the main show whereas the second hour was You're Hired.

Specials

References

External links 

 

2013 British television seasons
09